Dublin Fingal is a parliamentary constituency which is represented in Dáil Éireann, the lower house of the Irish parliament or Oireachtas, from the 2016 general election onwards. The constituency elects 5 deputies (Teachtaí Dála, commonly known as TDs) on the system of proportional representation by means of the single transferable vote (PR-STV).

History and boundaries
The constituency was established by the Electoral (Amendment) (Dáil Constituencies) Act 2013. It incorporated all of the old Dublin North, Swords-Forrest and Kilsallaghan from Dublin West, and Balgriffin and Turnapin from Dublin North-East. The name Dublin Fingal for the constituency that became Dublin North had been proposed by John Boland in 1980.

The Electoral (Amendment) (Dáil Constituencies) Act 2017 defines the constituency as:

TDs

Elections

2020 general election

2019 by-election
A by-election was held in the constituency on 29 November 2019, to fill the seat vacated by Clare Daly on her election to the European Parliament in May 2019.

2016 general election

See also
Elections in the Republic of Ireland
Politics of the Republic of Ireland
List of Dáil by-elections
List of political parties in the Republic of Ireland

References

External links
 Oireachtas Constituency Dashboards
 Oireachtas Members Database

Dáil constituencies
Politics of Fingal
2016 establishments in Ireland
Constituencies established in 2016
Parliamentary constituencies in County Dublin